The 2019 Russian Women's Football Championship was the 28th season of the Russian women's football top level league. Ryazan-VDV were the defending champions.

Teams

League table

Results

Matches 1–14

Matches 15–21

Top scorers

Hat-tricks

4 Player scored 4 goals

References 

2019
Russia
Russia
Women
Women